Elin Lundberg (born 15 May 1993) is a Swedish ice hockey player. She competed in the 2018 Winter Olympics.

References

External links
 

1993 births
Ice hockey players at the 2018 Winter Olympics
Living people
Olympic ice hockey players of Sweden
People from Malung-Sälen Municipality
Swedish women's ice hockey defencemen
Sportspeople from Dalarna County